Randy Poltl is a former professional American football player who played defensive back for three seasons for the Minnesota Vikings and Denver Broncos.

References

1952 births
American football cornerbacks
Stanford Cardinal football players
Minnesota Vikings players
Denver Broncos players
Living people